Buache Peak is the mostly ice-covered peak rising to 595 m on Two Hummock Island in the Palmer Archipelago, Antarctica. It surmounts Urania Cove on the north. The feature has precipitous and partly ice-free west-northwest slopes, and is one of the two ‘hummocks’ that gave the name of the island.

The peak is named after the French cartographer Philippe Buache (1700–1773), who published maps of the south polar region in 1739 and 1754.

Location
British mapping in 1978.

Maps
 British Antarctic Territory.  Scale 1:200000 topographic map.  DOS 610 Series, Sheet W 64 60.  Directorate of Overseas Surveys, UK, 1978.
 Antarctic Digital Database (ADD). Scale 1:250000 topographic map of Antarctica. Scientific Committee on Antarctic Research (SCAR). Since 1993, regularly upgraded and updated.

Notes

References
 Bulgarian Antarctic Gazetteer. Antarctic Place-names Commission. (details in Bulgarian, basic data in English)
 Buache Peak. SCAR Composite Antarctic Gazetteer.

External links
 Buache Peak. Copernix satellite image

Two Hummock Island
Mountains of the Palmer Archipelago
Bulgaria and the Antarctic